Greece competed at the 1908 Summer Olympics in London, England. Greek athletes have competed in every Summer Olympic Games.

Medalists

Results by event

Athletics

Greece's best results were a trio of silver medals, one by Konstantinos Tsiklitiras in each of the standing jumps and the third by Mikhail Dorizas in the freestyle javelin.

Cycling

Greece had one long-distance cyclist enter the cycling competitions in 1908.  He did not finish either of his races.

Shooting

Anastasios Metaxas (GRE) is generally credited with a bronze medal in men's individual trap shooting; no tie-breaker was held. The 1908 official report lists Metaxas as having tied with Alexander Maunder (GBR) and assigns bronze medals to each. However, Metaxas does not appear in the IOC medal database, which lists only Maunder as sole bronze medalist.

Sources

References

Nations at the 1908 Summer Olympics
1908
Olympics